The Yangpu Ancient Salt Field is an archeological heritage site in Yantian village, on the Yangpu Peninsula in Hainan, China. The site is an example of salt's various roles in Chinese history. The area comprises more than 1,000 stones, cut flat on top, which are used to evaporate seawater to produce salt. The stones have a thin rim around the edge to contain the water. During high tide, the surface of the stones becomes filled with seawater. During low tide, this evaporates, leaving the salt, which is then collected.

The area was established around 800 AD when a group of salt workers from Putian city in Fujian province moved to Yangpu. Today, only a small group of villagers continue to make salt using this method and it is not their main source of income.

References

External links

Images

Geography of Hainan
Major National Historical and Cultural Sites in Hainan